Opstead is an unincorporated community in East Side Township, Mille Lacs County, Minnesota, United States, near Isle and Malmo. It is along 475th Street near 30th Avenue, Mille Lacs County Road 30.

A post office called Opstead was established in 1889, and remained in operation until 1933. The community was originally built up chiefly by Swedes.

References

Unincorporated communities in Mille Lacs County, Minnesota
Unincorporated communities in Minnesota